Mateen is a given name and surname. Notable people with the name include:

Surname:
A. T. M. Abdul Mateen, Pakistani politician
Bushra Mateen (born 1943), vice chancellor of Lahore College for Women University
Ernest Mateen (1966–2012), United States and world cruiserweight boxing champion
Omar Mateen (1986–2016), US mass murderer in Orlando, Florida
Sabir Mateen (born 1951), American avant-garde jazz musician and composer
Syidah Mateen (born 1964), plaintiff in a court case in North Carolina, US, seeking to allow Muslims to swear on the Qur'an instead of the Bible

Given name:
Chaudhary Mateen Ahmed (born 1958), Indian National Congress politician
Mateen Ansari (1915–1943), in the Indian Army during World War II, member of the British Army Aid Group, awarded the George Cross posthumously
Mateen Bolkiah (born 1991), tenth child of Hassanal Bolkiah, Sultan of Brunei and his former wife, Hajah Mariam
Mateen Cleaves (born 1977), American basketball player

See also
Macteens